Nemours-Nedroma is a volcanic field in Algeria. Part of the larger Oranie volcanic field, it has erupted alkali basalts, with one eruption date being 2.1 million years ago.

References 

Pleistocene volcanoes
Volcanoes of Algeria
Volcanic fields